Pete Crow-Armstrong (born March 25, 2002) is an American professional baseball outfielder in the Chicago Cubs organization.

Amateur career
Crow-Armstrong attended Harvard-Westlake School in Los Angeles, California, where he played baseball. In 2019, his junior year, he was named the Los Angeles Times Player of the Year after hitting .395 with three home runs, 23 RBIs, forty runs, and 47 hits over 34 games, striking out only seven times. That summer, he played in the 2019 Under Armour All-America Baseball Game. In 2020, his senior year, he was batting .514 before the baseball season was cut short due to the COVID-19 pandemic. During his amateur career, Crow-Armstrong played for USA Baseball four times, playing on their 12U, 15U, and 18U teams. He committed to play college baseball at Vanderbilt University in the fall of 2017.

Professional career

New York Mets
Crow-Armstrong was considered one of the top prospects for the 2020 Major League Baseball draft. He was selected in the first round with the 19th overall selection by the New York Mets. He signed with the Mets on June 25 for a bonus of $3.4 million. He did not play a minor league game in 2020 due to the cancellation of the minor league season caused by the pandemic. To begin the 2021 season, he was assigned to the St. Lucie Mets of the Low-A Southeast League. On May 18, it was announced that Crow-Armstrong would undergo surgery on his right shoulder for a glenoid labral articular disruption, ending his 2021 season. Over 24 at-bats prior to the injury, he hit .417 with four RBIs and two stolen bases.

Chicago Cubs
On July 30, 2021, Crow-Armstrong was traded to the Chicago Cubs in exchange for Javier Báez and Trevor Williams. He was assigned to the Myrtle Beach Pelicans of the Low-A Carolina League to begin the 2022 season. He was promoted to the South Bend Cubs of the High-A Midwest League in late May. He was selected to represent the Cubs at the 2022 All-Star Futures Game. He was named a 2022 MiLB Gold Glove as one of the three best defensive outfielders in the minor leagues.

On February 6, 2023, Crow-Armstrong was invited as one of the 32 non-roster players to be included in the Cubs' spring training camp.

Personal life
Crow-Armstrong played Little League in the Sherman Oaks Little League. His parents, Matthew John Armstrong and Ashley Crow, are both actors.

References

External links

2002 births
Living people
People from Sherman Oaks, Los Angeles
Baseball outfielders
Baseball players from California
Minor league baseball players
St. Lucie Mets players
United States national baseball team players
Myrtle Beach Pelicans players
South Bend Cubs players
Harvard-Westlake School alumni